A salt lake is a lake containing a high concentration of salt.

Salt Lake may also refer to:

Places

Lakes 
 North America:
 Salt Lake (Arkansas), in Clark County
 Salt Lake (Brown County, South Dakota)
 Salt Lake (Minnesota–South Dakota), (U.S.) bi-state lake, in counties of Lac qui Parle (MN) and Deuel (SD)
 Salt Lake (Campbell County, South Dakota)
 Salt Lake (Florida), a lake in Pinellas County, Florida, United States
 Little Salt Lake, small salt lake in Utah
 Great Salt Lake, the largest salt lake in the Western Hemisphere, located in northern Utah, U.S.
 Great Salt Lake Desert, a large playa in northern Utah
 Zuñi Salt Lake, a rare, high desert lake (a classic maar) south of the Zuni Pueblo, New Mexico
 Salt Lake (Saskatchewan), a lake in Saskatchewan, Canada
 Oceania:
 Salt Lake (New Zealand), in the Northland Region
 Europe:
 Salt Lake (Poland), a lake in Pomeranian Voivodeship
 Larnaca Salt Lake, Cyprus
 Asia:
 Lake Tuz, whose Turkish name 'Tuz Gölü' means 'salt lake', found in central Anatolia, Turkey
 Dead Sea, west of Jordan, east of Israel, east of Palestinian Authorities
 Sambhar Salt Lake, India’s largest salt lake, west of Jaipur

Landmarks 
 Salt Lake City International Airport, an airport in Utah
 Salt Lake Stadium, the world's second largest stadium, formally named Yuva Bharati Krirangan, located in Kolkata, India
 Salt Lake Temple, a temple of The Church of Jesus Christ of Latter-day Saints

Municipalities
 India
 Salt Lake City, Kolkata, popular nickname for Bidhannagar, Kolkata, India
United States
 Salt Lake, Hawaii, neighborhood on the island of Oahu
 In Utah:
 Salt Lake City, capital of Utah and county seat of Salt Lake County
 Salt Lake County, Utah
 Salt Lake Valley
 North Salt Lake, Utah
 South Salt Lake, Utah

Salt Lake City sport teams 
 Real Salt Lake, in Major League Soccer 
 Salt Lake Bees, in minor league baseball

Other uses
 USS Salt Lake City,  two United States Navy vessels

See also
 Dabasun Nor (disambiguation), Mongolian for 'Salt Lake'
 Salt River (disambiguation)